State Route 148 (SR 148) is a  state highway in the U.S. state of Maine. Running through portions of Franklin and Somerset counties, it connects SR 43 in the town of Industry with Madison at U.S. Route 201 (US 201).

Route description
SR 148 begins at a stop-controlled intersection with SR 43 at Goodrich Corner, a rural settlement within the town of Industry. The road heads north mostly through forested areas though it skirts the easterly edges of small hills and passes to the east of Clearwater Pond. After passing a small farm with numerous work buildings, SR 148 makes a 90-degree bend to head east to the settlement of West Mills. Continuing east, the highway briefly enters the town of Starks in Somerset County and curves to the north. It briefly reenters Industry, Franklin County before curving back to the east to cross Lemon Creek and into Anson, Somerset County. It continues traveling through mostly wooded areas before reaching the settlement of Five Points where it intersects and forms a concurrency with SR 43 towards downtown Anson. The two routes enter the more urbanized area of Anson on Main Street passing a post office and the town hall before curving to the north at Kennebec River. The road reaches an intersection with US 201A and SR 8; at this point, the four routes cross the river into Madison.

After crossing the river, Main Street, carrying the four numbered routes, passes a factory, crosses a railroad, and enters the central business district of Madison. After passing numerous restaurants, offices, and churches, Main Street reaches an intersection with Weston Avenue and Old Point Avenue. US 201A and SR 8 head south along Old Point Avenue, SR 43 heads north along Weston Avenue, while SR 148 continues east along Main Street. SR 148 passes a few more businesses and some schools, but is mostly passing through a residential neighborhood. Upon exiting the center of the town, the road heads through a more rural area, though many homes and some businesses line the road. It passes the front of Madison Area Memorial High School before heading through the settlements of Ellis Corner and Martin Corner. At the settlement of White School Corner, SR 148 ends at US 201 (Lakewood Road) though the road continues east as White School House Road towards the southern shore of Wesserunsett Lake.

Major junctions

References

External links

Floodgap Roadgap's RoadsAroundME: Maine State Route 148

148
Transportation in Franklin County, Maine
Transportation in Somerset County, Maine